The Hungary women's national field hockey team represent Hungary in women's international field hockey competitions and is controlled by the Hungarian Hockey Association, the governing body for field hockey in Hungary.

The team competes in the Women's EuroHockey Championship III, the third level of the women's European field hockey championships.

Tournament record

EuroHockey Championship III
2019 – 6th place
2021 – Withdrew

See also
Hungary men's national field hockey team

References

European women's national field hockey teams
National team
Field hockey